Anna Van Ghell was a Belgian singer who starred in numerous operettas in Paris. She was called Anna Vanghel or Vanghell in France.

Life 
Van Ghell was the student of her father who was a conductor.

She made her debut at the Théâtre des Bouffes-Parisiens, in the travesti role of prince Raphael in La princesse de Trébizonde, 7 December 1869, then appeared in Les Bavardes. She left the Bouffes for the Théâtre des Variétés,  to play the role of Fiorella in Les Brigands. She played Jane in Le trône d'Ecosse by Hervé, performed in Les cent vierges by Charles Lecocq, and the role of Metella in Offenbach's  La Vie Parisienne. She appeared at  the Théâtre de l'Opéra-Comique under the name of Rose Friquet but after two or three performances her contract was terminated because the repertoire did not suit her, and she returned to the Variétés. She went to the Théâtre des Folies-Dramatiques for the revival of La Fiancée du roi de Garbes. She played the role of Clairette in La Fille de madame Angot.

Repertoire 
 1868: Le Petit Poucet by François Anatole Laurent de Rillé, libretto by Eugène Leterrier and Albert Vanloo at the Théâtre de l'Athénée, 23 April 1869 
 1869: Le petit Faust by Hervé, Théâtre des Folies-Dramatiques as Méphisto
 1869: Offenbach's La princesse de Trébizonde, 7 December 1869, Théâtre des Bouffes-Parisiens
 1871: Les Brigands, Théâtre des Variétés as Fiorella
 1872: Les cent vierges by Charles Lecocq, Théâtre des Variétés as Gabrielle
 1873: Les Dragons de Villars, February 1873, at the Opéra-Comique as Rose Friquet
 1873: La Vie parisienne, Théâtre des Variétés as Métella
 1874: Le Parachute by Bell
 1874: Le Petit Faust by Hervé at the Théâtre des Menus Plaisirs as Méphisto
 1874: La Vie parisienne, Théâtre des Variétés as Métella
 1875: La fille de Madame Angot at the Théâtre des Folies-Dramatiques as Clairette
 1877: La Foire Saint-Laurent by Offenbach, 10 February 1877
 1877: , féérie, music by Adolphe De Groot, libretto by Adolphe d'Ennery, Clairville and Albert Monnier, revived 27 October 1877, at the Théâtre du Châtelet.

References

External links 
  Portraits of Anna Van Ghell on the web site of the Bibliothèque nationale de France BnF

Belgian opera singers
19th-century Belgian women singers